Rômulo Barral (born May 3, 1982, Diamantina-MG) is a Brazilian Jiu Jitsu competitor. He is a black belt under Vinicius Magalhaes and competes for Gracie Barra, where he has won numerous championships. Rômulo Barral is one of the top Brazilian Jiu Jitsu fighters in the "Meio Pesado" weight division. Rômulo Barral maintained this black belt status in the years that followed with consistent medals at the top BJJ tournaments in the world. In August 2011, Rômulo established his own Gracie Barra academy in Northridge, California, proving that he is also a coach. Rômulo is a 5-time black belt world champion, 3-time silver medalist in the open weight division, and a no-gi world champion, and the 2013 ADCC champion.

Mixed martial arts record

|-
| Win
|align=center|2–0
| Adrian Valdez
| Technical Submission (rear-naked choke)
| Rage In The Cage 122
| 
|align=center|2
|align=center|1:20
|Phoenix, AZ, United States
|
|-
| Win
|align=center|1–0
| Fabiano Fabiano
| Technical Submission (rear-naked choke)
| Arena
| 
|align=center|1
|align=center|n/a
|Belo Horizonte, Brazil
|

References

 Bjj Heroes: Romulo Barral
 Romulo Barral career on MARanking
 http://www.radioautofm.com.br/home/?pg=noticia&id=1658

Brazilian male mixed martial artists
Mixed martial artists utilizing Brazilian jiu-jitsu
Brazilian practitioners of Brazilian jiu-jitsu
Living people
1983 births
World No-Gi Brazilian Jiu-Jitsu Championship medalists